Malatya is a city in Turkey.

Malatya may also refer to nearby places in Turkey:
Malatya Province
Malatya Plain
Malatya Mountains, part of Southeastern Taurus Mountains
Malatya SK, a sports club

See also
 Malaita, a place in the Solomon Islands